Get Connected UK is a support service for under-25s in the United Kingdom. Young people can contact the helpline in confidence with any problem and a trained volunteer will find them the most appropriate help using a directory of over 10,000 services around the country. Young people can call, email, text or web chat.

In 2016, Get Connected merged with YouthNet UK, a charity providing online support and advice. The combined charity trades as The Mix and continues to use the Get Connected brand.

Origins and role 
Get Connected was established in 1999 by a partnership between the Suzy Lamplugh Trust and British Transport Police, with support from Railway Children. Diana Lamplugh wanted to provide help to young people to young people under 25 who had run away from home or been thrown out. Get Connected’s role was to put these young people in touch, for free, with whatever service they needed. The establishing principle was to empower the young person to make their own decision about the help they need, with the role of Get Connected being that of a gateway for a young person on the street to access any help they might need. Get Connected has developed beyond the initial remit, to help any young person under 25.

Helpline

Get Connected Helpline provides help via phone, email, SMS or webchat. Whichever means of contact a young person chooses, each contact usually includes three stages: going through the problem, seeing what your options are, and contacting further help. The Helpline Volunteer helps the young person decide what they want to happen next, whether it is to change their situation or simply talk to someone about it. Get Connected gives contact information for the young person’s chosen source of support by phone, text to their mobile, or via email or webchat if they are online. For those young people who have no credit, do not want a phone call to show up on their phone bill or are simply too scared to explain their worries themselves, Get Connected’s Helpline Volunteers may be able to make a one-off connection to another service.

Organisation

Get Connected is made up of a mixture of paid staff and volunteers. The CEO of Get Connected is Jessica Taplin.

Fundraising

Get Connected raises funds through event fundraising, corporate partnerships, and individual giving.  The largest of fundraising events is the annual auction organised in conjunction with The Carphone Warehouse. Other events include quiz nights, comedy nights, runs, skydiving, trekking, cycles and other activities.
In 2000, Get Connected became an independent charity and in 2001, joined The Carphone Warehouse in a partnership that continues today.
The Carphone Warehouse supplies Get Connected with office and helpline equipment and it has been instrumental in ensuring it is free to call from all landline and mobile. This partnership won the Charity Times Corporate Partnership Award in 2003 and the Voluntary Sector Excellence Award for Corporate Partnership in 2006.

In 2003, Get Connected developed an email service in order to make their help more accessible to young people with speaking or hearing impairments. One-to-one help via live webchat was launched in 2006 and consequently won the ICT Hub Award for Delivering Social and Environmental Benefits in 2007.

Another corporate partnership is with Merrill Lynch. A number of other corporate supporters with who Get Connected have developed relationships, such as The Finsbury Group, Eatsleepthink Design and HH Associates help by either pro bono services or gifts in kind, such as printing and design, media space and online coverage. Get Connected and Eatsleepthink Design won a Corporate Community Involvement Award in 2008. 
Get Connected also receives support of numerous corporate foundations, including Vodafone UK Foundation, Lloyds TSB Foundations and KPMG Foundation, and trusts, such as Children in Need, The Dulverton Trust, The Sylvia Adams Charitable Trust, Volant Charitable Trust, and Help a London Child.
Other supporters of Get Connected include Girls Get Connected, a women’s networking initiative. It hosts a variety of networking events that enable its members to make contact with other like-minded business women, whilst also raising funds for Get Connected.
Other supporters include Get Connected’s “Best Friend” Daniel Radcliffe.

References 

Borehamwood
Charities for young adults
Organisations based in Hertfordshire
Science and technology in Hertfordshire
1999 establishments in the United Kingdom
Organizations established in 1999
Youth charities based in the United Kingdom